Yuzhny (masculine), Yuzhnaya (feminine), or Yuzhnoye (neuter) is the name of several inhabited localities in Russia.

Modern inhabited localities

Altai Krai
As of 2010, two inhabited localities in Altai Krai bear this name.

Urban localities
Yuzhny, Barnaul, Altai Krai, a work settlement under the administrative jurisdiction of Yuzhnaya Settlement Administration of the city of krai significance of Barnaul

Rural localities
Yuzhny, Smolensky District, Altai Krai, a settlement in Novotyryshkinsky Selsoviet of Smolensky District

Amur Oblast
As of 2010, one rural locality in Amur Oblast bears this name:
Yuzhny, Amur Oblast, a settlement in Paninsky Rural Settlement of Oktyabrsky District

Republic of Bashkortostan
As of 2010, two rural localities in the Republic of Bashkortostan bear this name:
Yuzhny, Republic of Bashkortostan, a village in Oktyabrsky Selsoviet of Sterlitamaksky District
Yuzhnaya, Republic of Bashkortostan, a village in Russko-Yurmashsky Selsoviet of Ufimsky District

Chelyabinsk Oblast
As of 2010, three inhabited localities in Chelyabinsk Oblast bear this name.

Urban localities
Yuzhny, Nagaybaksky District, Chelyabinsk Oblast, a work settlement in Nagaybaksky District

Rural localities
Yuzhny, Zlatoust, Chelyabinsk Oblast, a settlement under the administrative jurisdiction of the city of Zlatoust
Yuzhny, Agapovsky District, Chelyabinsk Oblast, a settlement in Magnitny Selsoviet of Agapovsky District

Chukotka Autonomous Okrug
As of 2010, one urban locality in Chukotka Autonomous Okrug bears this name:
Yuzhny, Chukotka Autonomous Okrug, an urban-type settlement in Chaunsky District

Republic of Dagestan
As of 2010, one rural locality in the Republic of Dagestan bears this name:
Yuzhnoye, Republic of Dagestan, a selo in Yuzhny Selsoviet of Kizlyarsky District

Republic of Ingushetia
As of 2010, one rural locality in the Republic of Ingushetia bears this name:
Yuzhnoye, Republic of Ingushetia, a selo in Malgobeksky District

Irkutsk Oblast
As of 2010, one rural locality in Irkutsk Oblast bears this name:
Yuzhny, Irkutsk Oblast, a settlement in Bratsky District

Kaliningrad Oblast
As of 2010, one rural locality in Kaliningrad Oblast bears this name:
Yuzhny, Kaliningrad Oblast, a settlement in Nivensky Rural Okrug of Bagrationovsky District

Republic of Kalmykia
As of 2010, two rural localities in the Republic of Kalmykia bear this name:
Yuzhny, Gorodovikovsky District, Republic of Kalmykia, a settlement in Yuzhnenskaya Rural Administration of Gorodovikovsky District
Yuzhny, Iki-Burulsky District, Republic of Kalmykia, a settlement in Chograyskaya Rural Administration of Iki-Burulsky District

Kemerovo Oblast
As of 2010, two rural localities in Kemerovo Oblast bear this name:
Yuzhny, Leninsk-Kuznetsky District, Kemerovo Oblast, a settlement in Shabanovskaya Rural Territory of Leninsk-Kuznetsky District
Yuzhny, Mezhdurechensky District, Kemerovo Oblast, a settlement in Bungurskaya Rural Territory of Mezhdurechensky District

Khabarovsk Krai
As of 2010, one rural locality in Khabarovsk Krai bears this name:
Yuzhny, Khabarovsk Krai, a settlement in imeni Lazo District

Kirov Oblast
As of 2010, two rural localities in Kirov Oblast bear this name:
Yuzhny, Kirov Oblast, a pochinok in Novosmailsky Rural Okrug of Malmyzhsky District
Yuzhnaya, Kirov Oblast, a village in Yakhrengsky Rural Okrug of Podosinovsky District

Krasnodar Krai
As of 2010, twelve rural localities in Krasnodar Krai bear this name:
Yuzhny, Armavir, Krasnodar Krai, a settlement in Prirechensky Rural Okrug of the City of Armavir
Yuzhny, Belorechensk, Krasnodar Krai, a settlement in Yuzhny Rural Okrug of the Town of Belorechensk
Yuzhny, Dinskoy District, Krasnodar Krai, a settlement in Yuzhno-Kubansky Rural Okrug of Dinskoy District
Yuzhny, Korenovsky District, Krasnodar Krai, a settlement under the administrative jurisdiction of the Town of  Korenovsk, Korenovsky District
Yuzhny, Krymsky District, Krasnodar Krai, a settlement in Yuzhny Rural Okrug of Krymsky District
Yuzhny, Kurganinsky District, Krasnodar Krai, a khutor in Mikhaylovsky Rural Okrug of Kurganinsky District
Yuzhny, Novokubansky District, Krasnodar Krai, a settlement in Sovetsky Rural Okrug of Novokubansky District
Yuzhny, Novopokrovsky District, Krasnodar Krai, a settlement in Kubansky Rural Okrug of Novopokrovsky District
Yuzhny, Otradnensky District, Krasnodar Krai, a settlement in Blagodarnensky Rural Okrug of Otradnensky District
Yuzhny, Pavlovsky District, Krasnodar Krai, a settlement in Srednechelbassky Rural Okrug of Pavlovsky District
Yuzhny, Tikhoretsky District, Krasnodar Krai, a settlement in Bratsky Rural Okrug of Tikhoretsky District
Yuzhny, Ust-Labinsky District, Krasnodar Krai, a settlement in Vimovsky Rural Okrug of Ust-Labinsky District

Kursk Oblast
As of 2010, two rural localities in Kursk Oblast bear this name:
Yuzhny, Korenevsky District, Kursk Oblast, a settlement in Verkhnegrunsky Selsoviet of Korenevsky District
Yuzhny, Sudzhansky District, Kursk Oblast, a khutor in Kazacheloknyansky Selsoviet of Sudzhansky District

Lipetsk Oblast
As of 2010, one rural locality in Lipetsk Oblast bears this name:
Yuzhny, Lipetsk Oblast, a settlement in Verkhnechesnochensky Selsoviet of Volovsky District

Nizhny Novgorod Oblast
As of 2010, two rural localities in Nizhny Novgorod Oblast bear this name:
Yuzhny, Tonshayevsky District, Nizhny Novgorod Oblast, a settlement in Kodochigovsky Selsoviet of Tonshayevsky District
Yuzhny, Vorotynsky District, Nizhny Novgorod Oblast, a settlement in Chugunovsky Selsoviet of Vorotynsky District

Novosibirsk Oblast
As of 2010, one rural locality in Novosibirsk Oblast bears this name:
Yuzhny, Novosibirsk Oblast, a settlement in Cherepanovsky District

Omsk Oblast
As of 2010, six rural localities in Omsk Oblast bear this name:
Yuzhny, Isilkulsky District, Omsk Oblast, a settlement in Boyevoy Rural Okrug of Isilkulsky District
Yuzhny, Lyubinsky District, Omsk Oblast, a settlement in Yuzhno-Lyubinsky Rural Okrug of Lyubinsky District
Yuzhny, Ust-Ishimsky District, Omsk Oblast, a settlement in Ust-Ishimsky Rural Okrug of Ust-Ishimsky District
Yuzhnoye, Azovsky Nemetsky natsionalny District, Omsk Oblast, a village in Azovsky Rural Okrug of Azovsky Nemetsky National District
Yuzhnoye, Pavlogradsky District, Omsk Oblast, a selo in Yuzhny Rural Okrug of Pavlogradsky District
Yuzhnoye, Sherbakulsky District, Omsk Oblast, a village in Borisovsky Rural Okrug of Sherbakulsky District

Orenburg Oblast
As of 2010, three rural localities in Orenburg Oblast bear this name:
Yuzhny, Alexandrovsky District, Orenburg Oblast, a settlement in Tukayevsky Selsoviet of Alexandrovsky District
Yuzhny, Krasnogvardeysky District, Orenburg Oblast, a settlement in Sverdlovsky Selsoviet of Krasnogvardeysky District
Yuzhny, Perevolotsky District, Orenburg Oblast, a khutor in Sadovy Selsoviet of Perevolotsky District

Oryol Oblast
As of 2010, one rural locality in Oryol Oblast bears this name:
Yuzhny, Oryol Oblast, a settlement in Pakhomovsky Selsoviet of Orlovsky District

Penza Oblast
As of 2010, one rural locality in Penza Oblast bears this name:
Yuzhny, Penza Oblast, a settlement in Yulovsky Selsoviet of Gorodishchensky District

Perm Krai
As of 2010, two rural localities in Perm Krai bear this name:
Yuzhny, Bolshesosnovsky District, Perm Krai, a settlement in Bolshesosnovsky District
Yuzhny, Suksunsky District, Perm Krai, a settlement in Suksunsky District

Rostov Oblast
As of 2010, two rural localities in Rostov Oblast bear this name:
Yuzhny, Azovsky District, Rostov Oblast, a settlement in Yelizavetovskoye Rural Settlement of Azovsky District
Yuzhny, Martynovsky District, Rostov Oblast, a settlement in Yuzhnenskoye Rural Settlement of Martynovsky District

Ryazan Oblast
As of 2010, two rural localities in Ryazan Oblast bear this name:
Yuzhny, Miloslavsky District, Ryazan Oblast, a settlement in Miloslavsky Rural Okrug of Miloslavsky District
Yuzhny, Skopinsky District, Ryazan Oblast, a settlement under the administrative jurisdiction of the work settlement of Pavelets, Skopinsky District

Samara Oblast
As of 2010, one rural locality in Samara Oblast bears this name:
Yuzhny, Samara Oblast, a settlement in Bolsheglushitsky District

Saratov Oblast
As of 2010, two rural localities in Saratov Oblast bear this name:
Yuzhny, Samoylovsky District, Saratov Oblast, a settlement in Samoylovsky District
Yuzhny, Yershovsky District, Saratov Oblast, a settlement in Yershovsky District

Smolensk Oblast
As of 2010, one rural locality in Smolensk Oblast bears this name:
Yuzhnaya, Smolensk Oblast, a village in Kaydakovskoye Rural Settlement of Vyazemsky District

Stavropol Krai
As of 2010, one rural locality in Stavropol Krai bears this name:
Yuzhny, Stavropol Krai, a settlement in Temizhbeksky Selsoviet of Novoalexandrovsky District

Sverdlovsk Oblast
As of 2010, one rural locality in Sverdlovsk Oblast bears this name:
Yuzhny, Sverdlovsk Oblast, a settlement in Pyshminsky District

Tomsk Oblast
As of 2010, one rural locality in Tomsk Oblast bears this name:
Yuzhny, Tomsk Oblast, a settlement in Tomsky District

Tula Oblast
As of 2013, four rural localities in Tula Oblast bear this name:
Yuzhny, Chernsky District, Tula Oblast, a settlement in Yerzhinskaya Rural Administration of Chernsky District
Yuzhny, Leninsky District, Tula Oblast, a settlement in Zaytsevsky Rural Okrug of Leninsky District
Yuzhny, Plavsky District, Tula Oblast, a settlement in Novo-Zhukovsky Rural Okrug of Plavsky District
Yuzhny, Uzlovsky District, Tula Oblast, a settlement in Fedorovsky Rural Okrug of Uzlovsky District

Tver Oblast
As of 2010, two rural localities in Tver Oblast bear this name:
Yuzhny, Nelidovsky District, Tver Oblast, a settlement in Nelidovsky District
Yuzhny, Ostashkovsky District, Tver Oblast, a settlement in Ostashkovsky District

Tyumen Oblast
As of 2010, one rural locality in Tyumen Oblast bears this name:
Yuzhnoye, Tyumen Oblast, a village in Zinovsky Rural Okrug of Yalutorovsky District

Vladimir Oblast
As of 2010, one rural locality in Vladimir Oblast bears this name:
Yuzhny, Vladimir Oblast, a settlement in Melenkovsky District

Vologda Oblast
As of 2010, one rural locality in Vologda Oblast bears this name:
Yuzhny, Vologda Oblast, a settlement in Charozersky Selsoviet of Kirillovsky District

Voronezh Oblast
As of 2010, one rural locality in Voronezh Oblast bears this name:
Yuzhny, Voronezh Oblast, a settlement in Medovskoye Rural Settlement of Bogucharsky District

Yaroslavl Oblast
As of 2010, one rural locality in Yaroslavl Oblast bears this name:
Yuzhny, Yaroslavl Oblast, a settlement in Lyubilkovsky Rural Okrug of Rostovsky District

Zabaykalsky Krai
As of 2010, one rural locality in Zabaykalsky Krai bears this name:
Yuzhnoye, Zabaykalsky Krai, a selo in Borzinsky District

Abolished inhabited localities
Yuzhny, Volgograd Oblast, a former urban-type settlement in Volgograd Oblast; merged into Volgograd in 2010